Casual Sex? is a 1988 American comedy film about two female friends in their 20s who go to a vacation resort in search of perfect men. It starred Lea Thompson, Victoria Jackson, Andrew Dice Clay, Jerry Levine, Mary Gross and was directed by Geneviève Robert, wife of film director Ivan Reitman, in her sole directing effort. Reitman served as the film's executive producer.

Plot
Stacy has a promiscuous past and, after learning of the AIDS epidemic, she wants to find a man whom she knows is clean. She convinces her childhood friend Melissa to go to a health spa (or resort) for singles so that they can hopefully each find the man of their dreams. As a concierge gift, they receive a basket filled with condoms. At the spa, Stacy meets Nick, a struggling musician whom she is taken with, and also encounters Vinny, a.k.a. the Vin Man, an annoying Italian-American man from New Jersey whom she tries to avoid.

At the resort's International Night, the men and women all take miniature flags of various countries and put them in plunger-shaped hats, then meet the person with the identical national flag. After becoming demoralized by a bad experience at the flag party, Melissa writes a letter that she leaves for Stacy saying she is returning to LA. However, Melissa connects with a spa staff member, Jamie, who has taken an apparent liking to her and yet who is very sweet, respectful and supportive of her. Some days later, when they are intimate, she experiences her very first orgasm. Meanwhile, Stacy finds Melissa's letter to her and, thinking that Melissa has left the resort alone in frustration, immediately returns to LA herself via the 2:00pm bus, not knowing that Melissa has remained at the resort.

Stacy had taken Nick with her back to LA and, once there, falls back into old behavior patterns of being a crutch for men. She lets Nick move in with her to try to get his fledgling music career off the ground. However, Stacy soon realizes that Nick's quirky habits (e.g., not having a checking account or a credit card, carrying all his personal belongings in plastic trash bags), idiosyncratic ways of thinking (not having his life together at this age and stage of life), and his narcissism are things that she cannot adapt to. She realizes that she actually does not really like him or see him as the man she thought he was back at the resort. Upon learning that Melissa is back at the resort and never even left, she hurriedly rents a pink Cadillac and drives all the way back, where she accidentally walks in on Melissa in bed with Jamie. Outside the room, Melissa tells Stacy about Jamie and how they have bonded with one another. Stacy is relieved that Melissa is in good spirits now and is thrilled that she and Jamie have found each other.

Then Stacy tells Melissa that she realizes she made a big mistake with Nick and realizes she has to end it with him. Stacy finds the fortitude within herself to take the drive back to LA to tell Nick that their relationship will not work and that he must leave her apartment and her life. Leaving the resort, she comes across Vinny waiting near the exit with his luggage in tow. He flags her down and begs her to let him in the car so she can drop him off at the nearest bus station. He wants to leave the health resort as well and, without prompting, Vinny promises not to come on to her or do anything else of the sort. Reluctantly, Stacy lets him get into the car with her but, this time, he does not come on to her or act pushy and desperate. Instead, on the drive to the bus station, they speak frankly and candidly with each other about their disappointment with their experience at the health resort. Vinny lets his guard down and speaks plainly about how he really just does not understand the world of male and female relationships and how it all works. He asks Stacy, "How do you do it, this male, female, relationship thing? How do you do it?" Stacy shares that she is in "relationship hell" at the moment, which surprises Vinny (as he is and has been enamored of Stacy thus far, viewing her as a very desirable woman and an all-around winner). When she asks him what he looks for in a woman, she is touched by what he shares with her and gets a new, enlightened view of him (i.e., that there is more to Vinny than the desperate, pathetic, trying-too-hard act she saw in him at the resort). Upon returning to New Jersey and thereafter, Vinny experiences changes in his attitude toward women and how he sees his life moving forward. He keeps in touch with Stacy via handwritten letters, sharing with her the epiphanies he is experiencing and how he is becoming a different person and his life is advancing and improving.

Meanwhile, back in her home, Stacy has confronted Nick and told him their relationship will not work. Nick is taken aback, acts hurt, and defiantly says that he sees himself as on the way to making it big in the music business and way beyond even what she can ever envision and that she will regret her decision. She wishes him the best and he storms out with his belongings. At this point, Stacy is relieved that it has ended and she is determined to take a break from men-at-large for an unspecified span of time to sort things out in her head.

Some time later, Stacy visits Melissa and Jamie, who now live together in their own home. At the end of the evening, Stacy says goodbye to Melissa and Jamie. She walks home by herself, where she finds Vinny waiting for her in a fancy limousine.  He has gone into business for himself running a limousine service and owns a whole fleet of limousines. He shares with Stacy that he started driving from his home in New Jersey just to take a drive and, the next thing he knew, he found himself in Chicago, Illinois. He then asked himself, "Vinny, where are you going?" He says he realized that he was driving to see Stacy. He wound up driving all the way from New Jersey to southern California just to see her. Stacy is taken with this and yet, when he asks her if she would like to talk or go someplace together, she initially is hesitant and says to him that it was very late. Vinny, being a gentleman this time (in contrast with their past times together) acts with reserve and respectfully takes her cue. Stacy apparently is moved by this and, seeing how he drove all the way from New Jersey to California just to see her, she calls out to him and says that, if he likes, he can come home with her and she can make him breakfast. He pauses a bit, turns around, and says that he is rather hungry, accepts her invitation, and even offers to be the one who makes breakfast. He says he has a gift for her. He walks over to the limousine, opens the door, reaches in, and presents an adorable Golden Retriever puppy to Stacy. She falls in love with Vinny while the puppy is licking her face. They leave together with the new puppy.

The scene now moves six years ahead and shows Melissa and Jamie ringing the doorbell of Stacy's home for a social gathering.  Stacy and Vinny are now married with two small boys and a now-fully grown Golden Retriever. As Vinny is greeting Jamie with his two boys and dog and having a great time with all, Stacy and Melissa are at a distance standing together and looking toward their two significant others. They playfully tease each other as they always have throughout their many years as friends. Stacy says to Melissa, "There's your boyfriend." Melissa replies, "So what, there's yours." Finally, Stacy says to the camera, "Yeah, that's my boyfriend." They have each become content and fulfilled women who have both finally found the man of their dreams. They both smile and hug one another and the film ends.

Cast
 Lea Thompson as Stacy
 Victoria Jackson as Melissa
 Stephen Shellen as Nick 
 Jerry Levine as Jamie
 Andrew Dice Clay as Vinny
 Mary Gross as Ileen
 Valerie Breiman as Megan
 Peter Dvorsky as Matthew
 David Sergeant as Frankie
 Cynthia Phillips as Ann
 Don Woodard as Gary
 Danny Breen as Dr. Goodman
 Bruce Abbott as Keith
 Susan Ann Connor as Dierdre

Reception
Casual Sex? was poorly received by critics. On Rotten Tomatoes, the film holds a rating of 31% from 13 reviews.

References

External links
 
 
 
 
 
 
 

1988 films
1988 romantic comedy films
1980s sex comedy films
American romantic comedy films
American sex comedy films
Films scored by Van Dyke Parks
Films about vacationing
Films set in Los Angeles
Universal Pictures films
1988 directorial debut films
1980s English-language films
1980s American films